During the 2006–07 English football season, Derby County competed in the Football League Championship.

Season summary
Derby County finished the season in third place in the Championship, four points behind champions Sunderland and two points behind runners-up Birmingham City. With new ownership, Derby had been able to compete in the transfer market for the first time in a number of years, with Luton Town's Steve Howard becoming the club's first £1 million signing since François Grenet six years previously and, alongside captures from Premiership clubs such as West Ham United's Stephen Bywater and Fulham's Dean Leacock, manager Billy Davies began shaping a side capable of competing at the right end of the table. This wasn't apparent from the off, however, and a return of just five points from the club's opening six fixtures did not hint at instant success for Davies, leaving influential and creative players such as Tommy Smith and Iñigo Idiakez to depart the club prior to the closing of the August transfer window. However, a 1–0 win at Wolverhampton Wanderers on 12 September proved a catalyst as the club lost only four of its next 27 fixtures (a run which included winning all six league fixtures in November and an eight-match winning streak of six league and two FA Cup games from 30 December to 10 February). After a 2–2 draw at home to Hull City on 10 February, Derby were six points clear at the top of the table and had strengthened for the promotion run-in with the signing of Tyrone Mears, Jay McEveley, Gary Teale, David Jones, Craig Fagan, Stephen Pearson and Jon Macken for a combined £5 million. However, a 2–0 defeat away to Plymouth Argyle in the fifth round preceded a notable wobble in results and the club recorded a return of just six points from the next five games, conceding top spot to Birmingham City after a 1–0 defeat at St. Andrews on 9 March. A resounding 5–1 win against Colchester United (by far the biggest win of a campaign which saw victory by a two-goal margin or greater on just six occasions) looked to have put the club back on track, but, after taking just 12 points from the next ten fixtures, the club slipped out of the automatic promotion places altogether and a 2–0 defeat at Crystal Palace in the penultimate game of the season confirmed a 3rd-placed finish and entry into the 2006–07 Championship playoffs.

Derby defeated West Bromwich Albion 1–0 in the play-off final with a goal from Stephen Pearson to return Derby to the top flight of English football for the first time in five seasons.

Striker Steve Howard, who was also Derby's top scorer that season, was awarded the Jack Stamps Trophy as Derby's player of the season. Defender Darren Moore was named in the PFA's Championship Team of the Year.

Kit
Spanish company Joma remained Derby's kits manufacturers, and introduced a new home kit for the season, the first time since 1998 that Derby had not used the same kit for two seasons running. The Derbyshire Building Society continued sponsoring the kits.

Final league table

Results
Derby County's score comes first

Legend

Football League Championship

Championship play-offs

FA Cup

League Cup

Players

First-team squad
Squad at end of season

Left club during season

Notes

References

2006-07
Derby County